Ge'a is a moshav in southern Israel. Located three kilometres south-east of Ashkelon near Beit Shikma and Talmei Yafeh, it falls under the jurisdiction of Hof Ashkelon Regional Council.

History
The moshav was founded in 1950 by Jewish immigrants from Czechoslovakia and Hungary, and was named after the depopulated Palestinian village of al-Jiyya, on whose lands it was built.

References

Moshavim
Populated places established in 1949
Populated places in Southern District (Israel)
1949 establishments in Israel
Czech-Jewish culture in Israel
Hungarian-Jewish culture in Israel
Slovak-Jewish culture in Israel